, publicly known mononymously as Misono (stylized as misono), is a Japanese singer-songwriter and TV personality. She was born in Kyoto, Japan, and is the younger sister of singer Koda Kumi.

Career 
In 2000, Misono participated in the summer vacation audition organized by Japanese label Avex, and was subsequently chosen by the label to become one of their artists. In 2002, she debuted as the vocalist of Day After Tomorrow (dat), a J-pop band formed by the Avex Trax label under the production of Mitsuru Igarashi. Only five months after their debut, they received the Newcomer of the Year award at the Japan Record Awards. In August 2015, after the release of their first greatest hits album, dat went on a indefinite hiatus.

In 2006, Misono debuted as a solo artist with the release of her first single, "VS", which was used as theme song for Nintendo DS videogame Tales of the Tempest, following previous songs by day after tomorrow that were used in this videogame franchise. The single debuted at number 4 on the Oricon charts. During this period, misono used classical Western fairy tales as inspiration for her visuals in music videos and promotional photographs, using themes such as Snow White ("VS"), Cinderella ("Kojin Jugyō"), The Ugly Duckling ("Speedrive"), and Peter Pan for her first studio album, Never+Land, released on February 2, 2007.

After the release of her first album, misono's music style switch into more punk rock-oriented pop songs. Three singles, produced by Straightener's Hidekazu Hinata, GO!GO!7188, and Onsoku Line, respectively, were released between September 2007 and January 2008. These songs were subsequently part of misono's second studio album, Say, which was released on July 16, 2008.

In November 2007, misono became a recurrent guest in Fuji TV variety show Quiz! Hexagon II, and during these period she participated in said show's comedic units "Misono & Hiroshi" with Hiroshi Shinagawa, and "Satoda Mai with Gōda Kyōdai" with Mai Satoda and Toshifumi Fujimoto.

On March 31, 2009, misono collaborated with her sister Kumi Koda for "It's All Love!", which became her single to top the Oricon charts and was certified gold by the Recording Industry Association of Japan.

Between 2009 and 2013, Misono released two cover albums, on which she covered several anisongs and popular songs by artists such as Avril Lavigne, Mayo Okamoto, Sayuri Ishikawa, as well as self-covers of day after tomorrow. She also released two mini compilations of her songs used for the Tales saga, and her third studio album, Me, on June 30, 2010.

Misono released her fourth studio album, Uchi, on her 30th birthday, on October 13, 2014. The album became a topic on social media due to an official note added to the album title which said "If the album doesn't sell 10k copies, misono won't be able to release another CD." The album failed to sell over 10k copies and questions were raised about Misono's possible retirement. However, she stated that that was not the case; she would just stop releasing albums, but she would not retire from the entertainment business. Her contract with Avex Management ended on October 31, 2018.

Personal life 
On July 16, 2017, Misono married Shinnosuke Nakamura, who is the drummer for Japanese rock band HighsidE.

After being hospitalized from March 29 to April 5, 2019, due to an unknown illness, it was revealed that Misono had been diagnosed with Ménière's disease in October 2019.

Discography

Studio albums
 2007: Never+Land
 2008: Say
 2010: Me
 2014: Uchi

Compilation albums
 2009: Tales with misono-Best-
 2009: Cover Album
 2010: Cover Album 2
 2013: Symphony with Misono Best

Filmography 
 2007: Obachan Chips
 2009: The Harimaya Bridge
 2012: Keiji Gasahime: Tokumei Kataku sousahan

References

External links 
  
 
 

1984 births
Living people
Actresses from Kyoto
Avex Group artists

Japanese television personalities
Japanese women pop singers
Japanese women rock singers
Musicians from Kyoto Prefecture
Tales (video game series) music
21st-century Japanese singers
21st-century Japanese women singers
People with Ménière's Disease